The 2019 Philippine Basketball Association (PBA) Commissioner's Cup, also known as the 2019 Honda–PBA Commissioner's Cup for sponsorship reasons, was the second conference of the 2019 PBA season. The tournament allows teams to hire foreign players or imports with a height limit of 6'10".

Format
The following format will be observed for the duration of the conference: 
 Single-round robin eliminations; 11 games per team; Teams are then seeded by basis on win–loss records.
Top eight teams will advance to the quarterfinals. In case of tie, a playoff game will be held only for the #8 seed.
Quarterfinals:
QF1: #1 vs #8 (#1 twice-to-beat)
QF2: #2 vs #7 (#2 twice-to-beat)
QF3: #3 vs #6 (best-of-3 series)
QF4: #4 vs #5 (best-of-3 series)
Semifinals (best-of-5 series):
SF1: QF1 Winner vs. QF4 Winner
SF2: QF2 Winner vs. QF3 Winner
Finals (best-of-7 series)
F1: SF1 Winner vs SF2 Winner

Elimination round

Team standings

Schedule

Results

Eighth seed playoff

Bracket

Quarterfinals

(1) TNT vs. (8) Alaska 
TNT, with the twice-to-beat advantage, only has to win once, while its opponent, Alaska, has to win twice.

(2) NorthPort vs. (7) San Miguel 
NorthPort, with the twice-to-beat advantage, only has to win once, while its opponent, San Miguel, has to win twice.

(3) Blackwater vs. (6) Rain or Shine 
This is a best-of-three playoff.

(4) Barangay Ginebra vs. (5) Magnolia 
This is a best-of-three playoff.

Semifinals
Both series are best-of-five playoffs.

(1) TNT vs. (4) Barangay Ginebra

(6) Rain or Shine vs. (7) San Miguel Beermen

Finals

Imports 
The following is the list of imports, which had played for their respective teams at least once, with the returning imports in italics. Highlighted are the imports who stayed with their respective teams for the whole conference.

Awards

Conference 
The Best Player and Best Import of the Conference awards were handed out prior to Game 4 of the Finals, at the Smart Araneta Coliseum:
Best Player of the Conference:  Jayson Castro 
Best Import of the Conference: Terrence Jones 
Finals MVP: Terrence Romeo

Players of the Week

Rookies of the Month

Statistics

Individual statistical leaders

Local players

Import players

Individual game highs

Local players

Import players

Team statistical leaders

References

External links
 Official website

Commissioner's Cup
PBA Commissioner's Cup